Hidden Star may refer to:

Skjulte stjerner, a Danish reality television series, a.k.a. "Hidden Star"
Meghe Dhaka Tara (1960 film), 1960 film by director Ritwik Ghatak